Montgomery v Lanarkshire Health Board [2015] UKSC 11 is a Scottish delict, medical negligence and English tort law case on doctors and pharmacists that outlines the rule on the disclosure of risks to satisfy the criteria of an informed consent. The Supreme Court departed and overruled the earlier House of Lords case in Sidaway v Board of Governors of the Bethlem Royal Hospital, in reconsidering the duty of care of a doctor towards a patient on medical treatment. The case changed the Bolam test to a greater test in medical negligence by introducing the general duty to attempt the disclosure of risks.

Facts

The claimant was a woman of small stature and a diabetic under the care of a doctor during her pregnancy and labour. The doctor did not inform her of the 9-10% risk of shoulder dystocia, where the baby's shoulders are unable to pass through the pelvis among diabetic women as she viewed the problem being very slight and a caesarean section was not in the claimant's interest.

The baby suffered from severe disabilities after birth due to shoulder dystocia. The claimant sought damages from the health board for negligence on the part of the doctor for failing to advise her on the risk of shoulder dystocia. The Court of Session ruled that there was no negligence based on the Hunter v Hanley test and that there was no causation since the claimant would not have submitted to a caesarean birth even if informed of the pregnancy risk.

Judgment
The Supreme Court affirmed the requirement of 'informed choice' or 'informed consent' by patients in medical treatment that rests fundamentally on the duty of disclosure by medical practitioners.

Lords  Kerr and Reed said:

Lords Neuberger, Clarke, Wilson and Hodge agreed.

Lady Hale gave a concurring opinion.

See also
Delict
English tort law
Breach of duty in English law

Notes

References

English tort case law
Scottish case law
Health law in the United Kingdom